Gardent is a French surname. Notable people with the name include:
Claire Gardent, French computer scientist and linguist
Philippe Gardent (handballer) (born 1964), French handball player
Philippe Gardent (rugby league) (born 1979), French rugby league player and former American football player

French-language surnames